Ricardo Sebastián Riquelme (born 28 September 1996) is an Argentine professional footballer who plays as an attacking midfielder.

Career
Riquelme's career started with Argentinos Juniors in 2008. He was promoted in their senior squad in 2016, making his bow in a 4–0 defeat to Unión Santa Fe on 6 May; he had previously been an unused substitute for matches with Aldosivi and Vélez Sarsfield. In 2017, Riquelme joined Danubio of the Uruguayan Primera División on loan. However, he returned months later without featuring. On 9 June 2018, Primera B de Chile side Unión San Felipe loaned Riquelme. After his debut on 21 July versus Deportes Puerto Montt, he scored his first goal in a win away to Deportes Copiapó on 30 September.

On 11 January 2019, Riquelme terminated his contract with Argentinos Juniors. He soon joined Barracas Central of Primera B Nacional, prior to departing in January 2020 to Spanish Tercera División outfit El Ejido. He debuted on 23 February during a four-goal victory against Atlético Porcuna, before making another appearance two weeks later versus Ciudad de Torredonjimeno; the season was soon stopped due to the COVID-19 pandemic. In August 2020, Riquelme made a return to Uruguay as he penned terms with Segunda División team Atenas. Seventeen appearances followed in the 2020 campaign.

In February 2021, Riquelme went back to his homeland to have trials with Primera Nacional duo Almirante Brown and Atlanta. He was given a contract by the latter on 27 February. Later that year, he had a spell at San Telmo, before he in mid-February 2022 joined Primera B Metropolitana side Acassuso. However, he only managed to play one game before it was confirmed on 5 April 2022, that he have had his contract terminated by mutual agreement, given the lack of minutes.

Personal life
Riquelme is the brother of ex-professional footballer Juan Román Riquelme, a former international for the Argentina national team.

Career statistics
.

References

External links

1996 births
Living people
People from San Fernando Partido
Argentine footballers
Association football midfielders
Argentine expatriate footballers
Expatriate footballers in Uruguay
Expatriate footballers in Chile
Expatriate footballers in Spain
Argentine expatriate sportspeople in Uruguay
Argentine expatriate sportspeople in Chile
Argentine expatriate sportspeople in Spain
Argentine Primera División players
Primera B de Chile players
Tercera División players
Uruguayan Segunda División players
Argentinos Juniors footballers
Danubio F.C. players
Unión San Felipe footballers
CD El Ejido players
Atenas de San Carlos players
Club Atlético Atlanta footballers
San Telmo footballers
Sportspeople from Buenos Aires Province